"Sleepless" is the debut single from Australian musician Flume. The track features Sydney based duo Antony for Cleopatra and was released on 1 August 2011.

Flume was discovered and signed in 2011 following an original artists competition managed by the Australian record company Future Classic. He submitted the tracks "Sleepless", "Over You" and "Paper Thin", but came second in the competition, after which he was picked up by Future Classic, and the singles were subsequently released.

Track listing
 "Sleepless" – 3:28
 "Over You" – 3:26
 "Paper Thin" – 2:56

2012 version

"Sleepless" was released as the second single from his debut studio album, Flume. The track reached its peak of number 53 in Australia on 4 February 2013 and was certified Gold.

Music video
The music video was directed by Damon Cameron and released on 6 September 2012.

Track listing
 Digital download
 "Sleepless" – 3:29

 Remixes – Part 1
 "Sleepless" (Original Mix) – 3:29
 "Sleepless" (Shlohmo Remix) – 5:17
 "Sleepless" (Midland Dub) – 6:01

 Remixes – Part 2
 "Sleepless" (Cosmo's Midnight Mix) – 3:33
 "Sleepless" (Charles Murdoch Mix) – 4:06

Charts

Certifications

References

2011 debut singles
2011 songs
2012 singles
Flume (musician) songs
Future Classic singles
Song recordings produced by Flume (musician)
Songs written by Flume (musician)